Joseph Rosati (30 January 1789 – 25 September 1843) was an Italian-born Catholic missionary to the United States who served as the first bishop of the Diocese of Saint Louis between 1826 and 1843. A member of the Congregation of the Mission, in 1820 he was appointed Provincial Superior over all the Vincentians in the United States.

Early life
Rosati was born in the town of Sora, then in the region of Campania, part of the Kingdom of Naples.  He completed his education in 1807 and entered the Congregation of the Mission, commonly called the Vincentian Fathers, in 1808. He was ordained a priest in 1811. Rosati had taken up the study of Hebrew. Felix de Andreis, his friend and preceptor, advised Rosati to put aside Hebrew and take up English as he would need it in someday preaching in an English-speaking country.

The Apostolic Administrator of Louisiana and the Two Floridas, Louis Dubourg, had gone to Rome for his consecration as a bishop. While in Italy, DuBourg stayed at Monte Citorio, the mother church of the Congregation of the Mission order in Rome, and seeking personnel to help carry out his mission on the American frontier, he eventually convinced the Vincentians to send a contingent to Missouri to construct a seminary. During his time in Europe, he traveled about,  One recruit he made was De Andreis, who, in turn, recruited his friend Rosati to accompany him to the New World.

Missionary in America
On 12 June 1816 the two Vicentians sailed from Bordeaux on the American brig Ranger, Dubourg having paid their passage. Rosati was ill for the entire forty-three days it took to sail to Baltimore, Maryland. There they found hospitality with the Sulpicians, with whom they stayed about a month. They then traveled by flatboat from Pittsburgh to Louisville, Kentucky, where bishop, Benedict Joseph Flaget invited them to Bardstown, Kentucky.  The two Italians taught theology at St. Thomas Seminary there, while they perfected their knowledge of the English language and adapted to life on the new continent. During his stay at Bardstown, Rosati made a mission excursion to Vincennes.

Dubourg himself returned to the United States on 4 September 1817, accompanied by a large group of priests and religious, also landing in Baltimore. From there he sent a request to Flaget that he accompany the two Vincentian priests to St. Louis to prepare the groups' arrival.

Flaget agreed to Dubourg's request and he and the two priests set out on horseback for St. Louis, a distance of over three hundred miles. En route, they were joined by Donatien Olivier at Kaskaskia, where they crossed the Mississippi River to reach the former French colony of  Ste. Genevieve. There they were welcomed by Henry Pratte, a native of the town and the first native-born Catholic priest of Missouri. Leaving De Andreis to help in the parish there, the group continued on to St. Louis, where they were shocked to find the church and rectory, built 40 years earlier, to be falling apart, totally unfurnished and not even having doors or windows. The priests had to sleep on the ground, as there was no floor, wrapped in buffalo robes.

Pratte was able to tidy up and fix the rectory to a minimal standard of occupancy, just in time for the arrival of Dubourg and his entourage on 15 January 1815. Wearing their full pontifical vestments, he and Flaget processed through the town, greeted by the majority of the 2,500 occupants of the town, and proceeded to the church, where he addressed his flock for the first time.

St. Mary's of the Barrens
The Catholic population of Perryville, Missouri was in need of a permanent resident priest, and had offered 640 acres of land to Dubourg in exchange for the regular services of a priest and a school for the children. Rosati moved to Perryville, where he opened St. Mary of the Barrens Seminary in 1818, to educate the young men of the region and to train new members for the Vincentian Society. For several years, he planned and supervised the construction of the school, while at the same time teaching most of the classes and functioning as the local pastor. In 1820, he was appointed the Vincentian Provincial Superior in the United States.

Episcopacy
In 1822, Rosati was appointed vicar apostolic of Mississippi and Alabama, and, the following year, appointed coadjutor bishop to Dubourg, whose territory extended from  Louisiana to Florida. He was based in St. Louis, while Dubourg lived in New Orleans.

This arrangement lasted until 1826, when, in the course of a trip to Rome, Dubourg unexpectedly submitted his resignation to the Holy See. Rosati wrote, "I was absolutely bewildered and could not persuade myself it was true." At that point, the Vatican decided to divide the diocese, establishing St. Louis as a separate episcopal see. On 18 July of that year, Rosati was appointed as the Apostolic Administrator of both dioceses. He was named as the first bishop of St. Louis on 20 March 1827.

Rosati's achievements include the opening of Mullanphy Hospital (later DePaul Hospital) by the Daughters of Charity of St. Vincent de Paul in 1828, the founding of St. Mary's of the Barrens College and  Seminary, the establishment of what would become Saint Louis University in 1829 and the construction of the first Cathedral of St. Louis from 1831 through 1834.

He took part in the first four Provincial Councils of Baltimore. In 1841, Rosati was appointed by Pope Gregory XVI to assist in negotiations between the Holy See and Haiti. Before leaving for Haiti, he consecrated Peter Richard Kenrick as his coadjutor. After submitting a report on his diplomatic mission to the pope, he died in Rome in 1843,  His remains were returned to St. Louis, and interred in his cathedral.

Slavery
Per studies by the St. Louis Archdiocese, Bishop Rosati is said to have owned slaves. In a financial ledger from 1830-1839, Bishop Rosati recorded the sale of “my negro boy called Peter about nine or ten years old” to Vincentian Father John Bouiller for the sum of $150.

Legacy
"Bishop Rosati was eminent for his holy life, his zeal as a priest, his successful administration as a bishop, his learning, his eloquence. He built up the diocese from a very slender beginning, organized the Indian missions, and extended the work of the Church beyond the Rocky Mountains."

Bishop Rosati is the namesake for an all-girls Roman Catholic high school, Rosati-Kain, located in the Central West End in the city of St. Louis, Missouri, located next to the Cathedral Basilica of Saint Louis.

References

Sources
Christensen, Lawrence O., et al.  Dictionary of Missouri Biography.  Columbia, MO:University of Missouri Press, 1997.  
Who Was Who in America:Historical Volume 1607–1896.  Chicato:Marquis Who's Who, 1967.
Archdiocese’s research into history with slavery reveals three bishops, priests as slaveowners

1789 births
1843 deaths
People from the Province of Frosinone
Vincentians
Italian Roman Catholic missionaries
Vincentian bishops
Roman Catholic Archdiocese of New Orleans
Roman Catholic Archdiocese of St. Louis
Clergy from St. Louis
19th-century Roman Catholic bishops in the United States
Burials at the Basilica of St. Louis, King of France
Roman Catholic bishops in Louisiana
Roman Catholic bishops in Missouri
Roman Catholic missionaries in the United States
People from Perryville, Missouri
Italian emigrants to the United States